Lichtenfelder's gecko (Goniurosaurus lichtenfelderi ) is a species of lizard in the family Eublepharidae. The species is endemic to southeastern Asia.

Geographic range
G. lichtenfelderi is found in southern China (including Hainan) and Vietnam. However, IUCN considers Chinese populations as belonging to other species.

Etymology
The specific name, lichtenfelderi, is in honor of engineer Charles Lichtenfelder, who collected the type specimen.

Description
Goniurosaurus lichtenfelderi is basically purple in colour.  It is crossbanded by five thick yellow stripes, which are edged on either side by black bands of equal width.  This pattern is the same along its tail, with the yellow changing to white in the central bands. The top of the head of this gecko is brown.  The body shape of this species is very similar to that of the leopard gecko, Eublepharis macularius.

References

Further reading
Börner, Achim Rüdiger (1981). "The genera of Asian eublepharine geckos and a hypothesis on their phylogeny". Misc. Art. Saurol. [privately printed, Cologne] 9 (1): 1–14. (Goniurosaurus lichtenfelderi, new combination).
Grismer, L. Lee (1987). "Evidence for the resurrection of Goniurosaurus Barbour (Reptilia: Eublepharidae) with a discussion on geographic variation in Goniurosaurus lichtenfelderi ". Acta Herpetologica Sinica 6 (1): 43–47.
Grismer, L. Lee; Shi Haitao; Nicolai L. Orlov; Natalia B. Ananjeva (2002). "A new species of Goniurosaurus (Squamata: Eublepharidae) from Hainan Island, China". Journal of Herpetology 36 (2): 217–224.
Grismer LL (2000). "Goniurosaurus murphyi ORLOV & DAREVSKY: a junior synonym of Goniurosaurus lichtenfelderi Mocquard". Journal of Herpetology 34 (3): 486–488.
Mocquard, François (1897). "Notes herpétologiques ". Bull. Mus. Hist. Nat., Paris [ser. 1], 3 (6): 211–217. (Eublepharis lichtenfelderi, new species, pp. 213–214). (in French).
Orlov, Nikolai; Ilya S. Darevsky (1999). "Description of a new mainland species of Goniurosaurus genus, from the north-eastern Vietnam". Russ. J. Herpetol. 6 (1): 72–78. (Goniurosaurus murphyi, new species).
Seufer H, Kaverkin Y, Kirschner A (editors) (2005). Die Lidgeckos. Kirschner und Seufer Verlag. 238 pp. (in German).
Smith MA (1935). The Fauna of British India, including Ceylon and Burma. Reptilia and Amphibia. Vol. II.—Sauria. London: Secretary of State for India in Council. (Taylor and Francis, printers). xiii + 440 pp. + Plate I + 2 maps. (Eublepharis lichtenfelderi, p. 129).
Zhao E, Adler K (1993). The Herpetology of China. Oxford, Ohio: Society for the Study of Amphibians and Reptiles (SSAR). 522 pp.

Goniurosaurus
Reptiles of China
Reptiles of Vietnam
Reptiles described in 1897
Taxa named by François Mocquard